Falko Kirsten (born 3 January 1964) is a German former figure skater. He is the 1980 World Junior bronze medalist, the 1983 St. Ivel International bronze medalist, and a five-time East German national champion. He competed at six European Championships, finishing twice in the top five; five World Championships; and the 1984 Winter Olympics in Sarajevo, finishing 16th. He represented the club SC Einheit Dresden.

Kirsten is the chairman of the Saxony Ice Sport Association (Sächsischen Eissport-Verband) and also works as a technical specialist.

Results

References

1964 births
Living people
German male single skaters
Figure skaters at the 1984 Winter Olympics
Olympic figure skaters of East Germany
Sportspeople from Dresden
World Junior Figure Skating Championships medalists